Aechmea williamsii is a species of flowering plant in the genus Aechmea. This species is native to Ecuador, Colombia, Peru, and northern Brazil.

References

williamsii
Flora of South America
Plants described in 1932